Master Mix is a remix album by Australian synthpop band Real Life. The album was released in a limited edition in Australia in November 1984 and features remixed versions of songs from the band's debut studio album Heartland. The album peaked at number 74 on the Australian Kent Music Report.

Track listing
All songs written by David Sterry and Richard Zatorski.

Charts

Release history

References

1984 albums
1984 remix albums
Remix albums by Australian artists
Albums produced by Steve Hillage
Real Life (band) albums